The electoral district of South-West Coast is an electorate of the Victorian Legislative Assembly. It was created prior to the 2002 election in order to replace the abolished seats of Portland and Warrnambool.

The seat is dominated by the town of Warrnambool, but also includes Portland, Port Fairy, Koroit, Heywood and Macarthur.

South-West Coast is located in ancestrally Liberal territory, and was thus a natural choice for Portland's former member, Denis Napthine, to transfer for the 2002 election.  He barely held onto his seat in the Labor landslide of that year, seeing his margin reduced to only 0.7 percent.  However, it has reverted to its previous form as a safe Liberal seat. Napthine subsequently served as Premier of Victoria from 2013 to 2014. Following his government's election loss to Labor in November 2014, Napthine resigned from parliament on 3 September 2015. Roma Britnell retained the seat for the Liberals at the ensuing by-election on 31 October.

Members for South-West Coast

Election results

See also
 2015 South-West Coast state by-election

References

External links
 Electorate profile: South-West Coast, Victorian Electoral Commission

2002 establishments in Australia
Electoral districts of Victoria (Australia)
Shire of Corangamite
Warrnambool
Shire of Glenelg
Shire of Moyne
Barwon South West (region)